Bolivia has submitted films for the Academy Award for Best International Feature Film since 1995. The award is handed out annually by the United States Academy of Motion Picture Arts and Sciences to a feature-length motion picture produced outside the United States that contains primarily non-English dialogue. It was not created until the 1956 Academy Awards, in which a competitive Academy Award of Merit, known as the Best Foreign Language Film Award, was created for non-English speaking films, and has been given annually since. Thirteen Bolivian films have been designated to compete for the Academy Award for Best Foreign Language Film. Five have been accepted by AMPAS, three of which were directed by Juan Carlos Valdivia. So far, no Bolivian film has yet been nominated for an Oscar.

The Bolivian submission is designated by the Asociación de Cineastas Bolivianos (Asocine).

Submissions
The Academy of Motion Picture Arts and Sciences has invited the film industries of various countries to submit their best film for the Academy Award for Best Foreign Language Film since 1956. The Foreign Language Film Award Committee oversees the process and reviews all the submitted films. Following this, they vote via secret ballot to determine the five nominees for the award. Below is a list of the films that have been submitted by Bolivia for review by the Academy for the award by year and the respective Academy Awards ceremony.

All films were made primarily in Spanish.

Three of Bolivia's submissions were directed by Juan Carlos Valdivia and two were co-productions with Mexico. Bolivia's first submission, Jonah and the Pink Whale, is an erotic drama set in the 1980s amidst an upper-class Bolivian family, against a backdrop of military politics and drug trafficking. Eleven years later, Valdivia was again in the competition with American Visa, a comedy-thriller about a Bolivian professor trying to get a visa to join his son and work illegally in the United States. Bolivia's most recent submission, Zona Sur, was also directed by Valdivia, but had no Mexican input. Zona Sur centers on a wealthy, white Bolivian divorcee who is living beyond her means in contemporary Bolivia, and her relationship with her three spoiled children and her two Aymara servants.

Sexual Dependency, a co-production with the United States, was Bolivia's second Oscar submission. Set in Santa Cruz, Bolivia and Ithaca, New York, it tells five barely connected stories of teenagers and their early sexual experiences..

See also
List of Academy Award winners and nominees for Best Foreign Language Film
List of Academy Award-winning foreign language films

Notes
 Bolivia's submission to the 78th Academy Awards, Say Good Morning to Dad, was disqualified because it did not arrive at the Academy on time.
 Bolivia submitted Los Andes no creen en Dios for review by the Academy at the 80th Academy Awards, but it did not appear on the list of official submissions.

Notes

References

External links
The Official Academy Awards Database
The Motion Picture Credits Database
IMDb Academy Awards Page

Bolivia
Academy Award for Best Foreign Language Film
Lists of films by country of production
Academy Award